Jean-Yves Le Gall (born 30 April 1959) is an engineering graduate from the École supérieure d'optique (1981) and holds a doctorate in engineering from the University of Paris-Sud (1983). He began his career in 1981 as a researcher at the Astronomy Laboratory, French National Scientific Research Center, where he worked on the European scientific satellites project Hipparcos and ISO. In 1985 he joined the Department of Industry and was assigned to the Space Office where he was particularly in charge of relations with the space industry.

The Minister for the Postal Service, Telecommunications and Space appointed Le Gall as advisor for space affairs in 1985. In this position, he participated in the definition of CNES and ESA programs. In 1993, he joined Novespace, a subsidiary of CNES, of which he was Managing Director. Le Gall was appointed as CNES Deputy Managing Director in 1996. In this function, he was the French Representative to the ESA. In 1998, he was appointed as Chairman and CEO of Starsem.

In 2001, he joined Arianespace as COO. Since 2002 till April 2013 he worked as an Arianespace CEO, was succeeded by Stéphane Israël. Since 2013 Jean-Yves Le Gall is a president of CNES.

Honors and recognitions
Le Gall was named by Aviation Week & Space Technology magazine as its 2014 Laureate for Space, based on his work at Arianespace. In 2006 he received title of "Satellite Executive of the Year" from Via Satellite magazine.

References

1959 births
Living people
Paris-Sud University alumni
French engineers
Businesspeople from Marseille
French people of Breton descent
Officiers of the Légion d'honneur
Commanders of the Ordre national du Mérite
Recipients of the Order of the Rising Sun, 2nd class
Scientists from Marseille